The Mummy: The Animated Series, also known as The Mummy: Manacle of Osiris  or just The Mummy is a 2002 action-adventure video game developed by Ubi Soft Milan and published by Ubi Soft for the Game Boy Advance, followed two years later by versions for Microsoft Windows and the PlayStation 2. The game is based on the Kids' WB animated television series of the same name, which is a continuation of the 2001 film The Mummy Returns.

Development
On February 20, 2002, it was announced video game developer Ubisoft had obtained the rights to The Mummy: The Animated Series from Universal Studios Consumer Products Group, enabling the publisher to produce games based on the brand. It was projected the Game Boy Advance game would be completed in the fall of 2002.

HIP Interactive had developed a new game based on The Mummy: The Animated Series for PlayStation 2, and PC. In May 2004, they revealed they would be showing off their new game at E3 later that year. On June 30, 2004, All In The Game LTD, who was co-producing the new game with HIP Interactive, revealed Corey Johnson would reprise his role as "Mr. Daniels" from the 1999 film The Mummy, in the new video game. According to casting director Phil Morris, Johnson was brought in to help reproduce the same production values of the original films and television show.

Release

Promotion
HIP Interactive debuted the PlayStation 2, and PC version of the game at E3 which took place May 11–14, 2004. Russian gaming magazine GameLand ran a print advertisement for the PlayStation 2 version of the game in their November 2004 issue.

Reception

When the original Game Boy Advance version of the game was released by Ubisoft on November 20, 2002, it received mostly positive reviews. GameSpot reviewed it February 4, 2003, and they claimed the game, "more than lives up to expectations." Total Games UK ranked the game 89% out of 100%.

References

External links

The Mummy video games
Ubisoft games
3D platform games
PlayStation 2 games
Windows games
Video game sequels
Single-player video games
2002 video games
Video games based on animated television series
Video games developed in France
Video games set in China
Video games set in Egypt
Video games set in Peru
Game Boy Advance games
Asobo Studio games